Sir Raymond William Whitney  (28 November 1930 – 15 August 2012) was a British Conservative politician and Member of Parliament.

Born in Northampton, Whitney was educated at Wellingborough School and the Royal Military Academy Sandhurst, before being commissioned into the Northamptonshire Regiment. He resigned in 1964 in order to join the Diplomatic Service and served from 1966 to 1968 as first secretary at the Office of British Chargé d'Affaires in Peking during the Cultural Revolution. He also served as deputy High Commissioner to Bangladesh between 1973 and 1976, and, in his final appointment, was head of the Information Research Department, the Foreign Office's counter-propaganda department.

Whitney was elected as (MP) for Wycombe at a by-election in 1978 caused by the death of Sir John Hall. He served as parliamentary private secretary (PPS) to Nigel Lawson and Peter Rees at the Treasury. After the 1983 general election he was appointed Parliamentary Under-Secretary of State at the Foreign Office, moving to occupy the same position at the Department of Health and Social Security from October 1984 to September 1986.

Whitney stepped down at the 2001 general election, and was succeeded by Paul Goodman.

References

External links 
 

1930 births
2012 deaths
People educated at Wellingborough School
Graduates of the Royal Military Academy Sandhurst
British diplomats
Conservative Party (UK) MPs for English constituencies
Officers of the Order of the British Empire
Knights Bachelor
Civil servants in the Foreign Office
UK MPs 1974–1979
UK MPs 1979–1983
UK MPs 1983–1987
UK MPs 1987–1992
UK MPs 1992–1997
UK MPs 1997–2001
Politicians awarded knighthoods
Information Research Department